MK Balaji is an Indian singer, songwriter, composer and independent artist from Chennai.  As a playback singer he has sung more than 200 songs in Tamil, Telugu and Kannada.  His first song a lyricist was for the movie Sethupathi. He has hosted popular TV shows in Star Vijay and Zee Tamil. He made a debut as an indie artist with his single Good Naai bad Aadu that takes a fun jab at meat eating animal lovers.

Biography

MK Balaji is the voice behind many South Indian film songs including "Rettai Kathire" from the Tamil movie Maattrraan directed by K. V. Anand starring Surya Sivakumar. He has delivered many successful songs in Tamil and Telugu. He has also collaborated with music directors like D Imman, Karthik Raja, Sundar C babu, Taj Noor, James Vasanthan, Sirpy, Sabesh–Murali and Srikanth Deva.

Live shows and tours

MK Balaji is one very few South Indian singers to perform for the Indian Premier League. He is a prominent stage performer performing for award functions, television shows, college pro shows and corporate events.  His tours overseas include shows in Paris, Japan, Dubai, Kuwait, Seychelles, Malaysia, Singapore and Sri Lanka to name a few. He has also toured with music directors Harris Jayaraj and Vijay Antony on their music shows.

TV host

As a television host he has hosted television shows like Paadum Office on STAR Vijay, a Tamil version of the popular Sa Re Ga Ma Pa on Zee Tamil and many other shows.

Early music

He started his singing career with reality shows on television.  His band V3, of which he was the lead singer, presented a sound track in the Oohlalala album which consists of original compositions by the winners of the show Oohlalala aired on the Tamil channel Sun TV. It was judged by the Oscar winner AR Rahman. His band was judged the winning band and he eventually got the breakthrough as a playback singer.

Discography

Below is the partial discography of the songs sung by MK Balaji.

Film songs

Single

As lyricist

As TV Host

References
 
 MK Balaji's official YouTube channel
 MK Balaji on his Musical Journey in IndiaGlitz
 Singer MK Balaji Exclusive Interview for IndiaInteracts
 MK Balaji back in business – Times of India
 Dr.PB Srinivas on MK Balaji
 MK Balaji's Songs in Raaga
 Silence is a source of power – MK Balaji
  MK Balaji – on twitter
  MK Balaji – on Facebook
  MK Balaji – on Instagram

Living people
Indian male playback singers
Tamil playback singers
Singers from Chennai
Tamil singers
Year of birth missing (living people)